The 2009 ICC Under-19 World Cup Qualifier was an international cricket tournament played in Canada from 1 to 13 September 2009. All matches were held in Toronto. The tournament served as the final state of the qualification process for the 2010 Under-19 World Cup in New Zealand. Ten teams participated in the event, with the top six teams progressing to the World Cup.

Teams

Africa Under-19 Championship
 (champion)
 (runner-up)

Americas Under-19 Championship
 (champion)
 (runner-up)

ACC Under-19 Elite Cup
 (champion)
 (runner-up)

East Asia-Pacific Under-19 Trophy
 (champion)
 (runner-up)

Europe Under-19 Division One
 (champion)
 (runner-up)

Squads

Round-robin

Points table
 The top six teams of the tournament qualified for the 2010 U-19 Cricket World Cup.

Fixtures
All the matches of the tournament were played in Toronto.

Sierra Leone were unable to participate in this tournament due to visa problems; their matches were scratched and their opponents were awarded two points.

Statistics

Most runs
The top five runscorers are included in this table, ranked by runs scored and then by batting average.

Source: CricketArchive

Most wickets

The top five wicket takers are listed in this table, ranked by wickets taken and then by bowling average.

Source: CricketArchive

See also

2010 ICC Under-19 Cricket World Cup

References

External links
Website of qualifiers on Cricinfo 
Official U-19 World Cup 2010 website

Under-19 Cricket World Cup Qualifier
2010 ICC Under-19 Cricket World Cup
Under-19 World Cup Qualifier
International cricket competitions in Ireland
Qualification for cricket competitions
Under-19 Cricket World Cup Qualifier